Lotis Melisande Key is a former Filipino-American professional film and theater actress who starred in 85 major films in Asia. She was born and lives in the United States, although she spent her childhood traveling the world with her family. She was Vice President of the Minnesota Christian Writers Guild. She is the author of the novels The Song of the Tree, A Thing Devoted, and A Song for the Wide Place.

Career
She received FAMAS Award nominations as Best Supporting Actress for the movies Dalawang Mukha Ng Tagumpay (1973) and Ibigay Mo Sa Akin Ang Langit (1975). She worked with the likes of Ramon Zamora in Ang Mahiwagang Daigdig Ni Pedro Penduko (1973), Tony Ferrer in Kung Fu Master (1974), Chiquito in Enter Garote (1974), Eddie Garcia in Lady Luck (1975), George Estregan in Bamboo Trap (1975), and Dante Varona in Silakbo (1975).

Key made about 11 movies with Comedy King Dolphy including Captain Barbell (1973), Fung Ku (1973), Facundo Alitaftaf (1978), Darna, Kuno? (1979), Max En Jess (1979) and Bugoy (1979).

In 1986, she moved to the U.S. and worked in industrial video, trade shows, TV commercials, theater, radio and on camera narration. She became a Christian theater director and writer. She wrote and produced plays that traveled all over the US and Canada. In 2007, she also took a team a large team to the Philippines to present shows in under-privileged areas. From directing and producing theater she moved on to writing and apart from numerous magazine and newspaper articles has published two literary novels: The Song of the Tree and A Thing Devoted.

Personal life
She is married to Renato "Bambi" Kabigting, a college basketball player for the Ateneo Blue Eagles and Crispa Redmanizers who went on to play for several professional Philippine Basketball Association teams including San Miguel, Alaska and Great Taste. They have a daughter, Abbey Key.
Key is now based in Minnesota. In 2014, Key and husband Bambi Kabigting took professional chess player Wesley So into their family. Key serves as the adoptive mother and manager of So.

Weng Weng's brother said that Key is the only Filipino celebrity to attend his funeral in 1992.

Selected filmography
Laurel Avenue (1993)
Untamed Heart (1993)
Sweet Revenge (1987)
Katawang Isinumpa (1982)
Bugoy (1979)
Max en Jess (1979)
Darna, Kuno? (1979)
Facundo Alitaftaf (1978)
Mokong (1978)
War Kami ng Misis Ko (1977)
Karunungang Itim (1976)
The Outside Man (1976)
Meron Akong Nakita (1975)
Ibigay Mo sa Akin Ang Langit (1975)
Sleeping Dragon (1975)
Walang Duwag sa Kayumanggi (1975)
Biyenan Ko ang Aking Anak (1974)
Kung Fu Master (1974)
Return of the Dragon (1974)
Dalawang Mukha ng Tagumpay (1973)
Captain Barbell (1973)
Fight Batman Fight! (1973)
Fung Ku (1973)
Ang Mahiwagang Daigdig Ni Pedro Penduko (1973)
Black Mama White Mama (1973)
Stardoom (1971)
Manigun Bagung Tao TV New Year presentation Channel 5 Manila Starred Alan Martell, Hilda Coronel and Beautiful Lotis Key and directed by Lino Broka 1970-

Books
The Song of the Tree
A Thing Devoted

References

External links
Lotis Key official website
Vice President Lotis Key in Minnesota Christian Writers Guild

Living people
Year of birth missing (living people)
American people of Filipino descent